SymbolicC++ is a general purpose computer algebra system written in the programming language C++. It is free software released under the terms of the GNU General Public License. SymbolicC++ is used by including a C++ header file or by linking against a library.

Examples 
#include <iostream>
#include "symbolicc++.h"
using namespace std;

int main(void)
{
 Symbolic x("x");
 cout << integrate(x+1, x);     // => 1/2*x^(2)+x
 Symbolic y("y");
 cout << df(y, x);              // => 0
 cout << df(y[x], x);           // => df(y[x],x)
 cout << df(exp(cos(y[x])), x); // => -sin(y[x])*df(y[x],x)*e^cos(y[x])
 return 0;
}

The following program fragment inverts the matrix

symbolically.

Symbolic theta("theta");
Symbolic R = ( (  cos(theta), sin(theta) ),
               ( -sin(theta), cos(theta) ) );
cout << R(0,1); // sin(theta)
Symbolic RI = R.inverse();
cout << RI[ (cos(theta)^2) == 1 - (sin(theta)^2) ];

The output is

[ cos(theta) −sin(theta) ]
[ sin(theta) cos(theta)  ]

The next program illustrates non-commutative symbols in SymbolicC++.  Here b is a Bose annihilation operator and bd is a Bose creation operator.  The variable vs denotes the vacuum state . The ~ operator toggles the commutativity of a variable, i.e. if b is commutative that ~b is non-commutative and if b is non-commutative ~b is commutative.

#include <iostream>
#include "symbolicc++.h"
using namespace std;

int main(void)
{
 // The operator b is the annihilation operator and bd is the creation operator
 Symbolic b("b"), bd("bd"), vs("vs");

 b = ~b; bd = ~bd; vs = ~vs;

 Equations rules = (b*bd == bd*b + 1, b*vs == 0);

 // Example 1
 Symbolic result1 = b*bd*b*bd;
 cout << "result1 = " << result1.subst_all(rules) << endl;
 cout << "result1*vs = " << (result1*vs).subst_all(rules) << endl;

 // Example 2
 Symbolic result2 = (b+bd)^4;
 cout << "result2 = " << result2.subst_all(rules) << endl;
 cout << "result2*vs = " << (result2*vs).subst_all(rules) << endl;

 return 0;
}

Further examples can be found in the books listed below.

History 
SymbolicC++ is described in a series of books on computer algebra.  The first book described the first version of SymbolicC++. In this version the main data type for symbolic computation was the Sum class. The list of available classes included

 Verylong   : An unbounded integer implementation
 Rational   : A template class for rational numbers
 Quaternion : A template class for quaternions
 Derive     : A template class for automatic differentiation
 Vector     : A template class for vectors (see vector space)
 Matrix     : A template class for matrices (see matrix (mathematics))
 Sum        : A template class for symbolic expressions

Example:
#include <iostream>
#include "rational.h"
#include "msymbol.h"
using namespace std;

int main(void)
{
 Sum<int> x("x",1);
 Sum<Rational<int> > y("y",1);
 cout << Int(y, y);       // => 1/2 yˆ2
 y.depend(x);
 cout << df(y, x);        // => df(y,x)
 return 0;
}

The second version of SymbolicC++ featured new classes such as the Polynomial class and initial support for simple integration. Support for the algebraic computation of Clifford algebras was described in using SymbolicC++ in 2002. Subsequently, support for Gröbner bases was added.
The third version features a complete rewrite of SymbolicC++ and was released in 2008. This version encapsulates all symbolic expressions in the Symbolic class.

Newer versions are available from the SymbolicC++ website.

See also
Comparison of computer algebra systems
GiNaC

References

External links 
 
 Programming exercises in SymbolicC++

Free computer algebra systems
Free software programmed in C++
C++ libraries
Articles with example C++ code